Diyan Bozhilov (Bulgarian: Диян Божилов; born 15 May 1971) is a former Bulgarian footballer and currently a manager.

Bozhilov played as a midfielder and spent most of his professional career in the Bulgarian First League playing for Dobrudzha Dobrich, Slavia Sofia, Botev Plovdiv and Beroe Stara Zagora.

Bozhilov spent couple of years in Greece playing for Chania, Larissa, Achaiki and Diagoras. He finished his career in 2007 after a brief spell in “B” PFG with Kaliakra Kavarna.

Diyan Bozhilov established himself as one of the biggest legends of Dobrudzha and club’s all-time leading goalscorer in “A” PFG with 35 goals.

References

1971 births
Living people
Bulgarian footballers
PFC Dobrudzha Dobrich players
PFC Slavia Sofia players
Botev Plovdiv players
PFC Beroe Stara Zagora players
First Professional Football League (Bulgaria) players
Bulgarian football managers
Association football midfielders
People from Dobrich